Alexander Levitzki (Hebrew: אלכסנדר לויצקי; born 13 August 1940) is an Israeli biochemist who is a professor of biochemistry at the Alexander Silberman Institute of Life Sciences, the Hebrew University of Jerusalem.

Birth and education 
Levitzki was born in 1940 in Palestine. He completed his M.Sc. in chemistry from the Hebrew University of Jerusalem in Israel. He received his Ph.D. in biochemistry and biophysics from the Hebrew University of Jerusalem and the Weizmann Institute of Science, in 1968. From 1968 to 1971, he was a post-doctoral fellow at the Department of Biochemistry, University of California at Berkeley in California, with Professor Daniel E. Koshland, Jr., where he worked in particular on negative cooperativity and half-of-the-sites reactivity. Contrary to the common misconception, Levitzki is not a descendant of the Hebrew Levite tribe.

Academic career 
In 1970, Levitzki became a senior scientist at the  Department of Biophysics, Weizmann Institute of Science. In 1974, he became an associate professor at the same institute.

In 1974, he became an associate professor at the Hebrew University of Jerusalem. In 1976, he was promoted to professor of biochemistry at the Hebrew University of Jerusalem. He has been visiting scientist at the National Cancer Institute, and Fogarty International Scholar, NIH, Bethesda, Maryland, visiting scholar at Stanford University in California, visiting professor at the University of Oregon (Eugene) and visiting professor at the University of California, San Francisco. He is also a member of the Israel Academy of Sciences and Humanities and was the head of its science section.

Research 
Levitzki is known for developing specific chemical inhibitors of cancer-induced protein kinases. He was the first to develop systematically tyrosine phosphorylation inhibitors (tyrphostins) against a wide spectrum of protein tyrosine kinases. Levitzki demonstrated (1993) that such an inhibitor of Bcr-Abl kinase induces death of chronic myeloid leukemia (CML) cells. This work led to the development of Gleevec by Novartis (1996), which is currently used, with great success, for therapy of patients afflicted by this disease. Levitzki also pioneered the inhibitors of EGF receptor, PDGF receptor, Her-2/neu, Jak-2, VEGFR and peptide based cell permeable PKB/Akt inhibitors. Levitzki also showed that PDGFR kinase inhibitors (PDGFR directed tyrphostins), released from nanoparticles or from a drug eluting stent can be used to inhibit restenosis after balloon angioplasty.

In 2006 his research team developed a method for inducing brain tumor cells to "commit suicide".

Awards 
In 1990, he was awarded the Israel Prize, in life sciences (following in the footsteps of his father, Jacob Levitzki, who had received the prize, for exact sciences, in 1953).

In 2005, he was awarded the Wolf Prize in Medicine for "pioneering signal transduction therapy and for developing tyrosine kinase inhibitors as effective agents against cancer and a range of other diseases".

 I. & H. Wachter Award, I. & H. Wachter Foundation (2014)

See also 
 List of Israel Prize recipients

References

External links 
 The CV of Alexander Levitzki
 The Wolf Prize in Medicine in 2005 (detail)

Living people
1940 births
Hebrew University of Jerusalem alumni
Israel Prize in life sciences recipients
Israel Prize in life sciences recipients who were biochemists
Israeli Jews
Israeli people of Ukrainian-Jewish descent
Jewish chemists
Wolf Prize in Medicine laureates
Members of the Israel Academy of Sciences and Humanities
Foreign associates of the National Academy of Sciences